Galumna is a genus of mites in the family Galumnidae.

Species 
Over 160 species are accepted within Galumna. A small number are organized under subgenera.

 Galumna aba Mahunka, 1989
 Galumna acutirostrum Ermilov & Anichkin, 2010
 Galumna aegyptica Abdel-Hamid, Al-Assiuty & Trrad, 1982
 Galumna agueroi P. Balogh, 1997    
 Galumna alata (Hermann, 1804)    
 Galumna ambigua Wallwork, 1977    
 Galumna angularis Jeleva, Scull & Cruz, 1984    
 Galumna ankaratra Mahunka, 1997    
 Galumna antalata Banks, 1916    
 Galumna appressala (Ewing, 1910)    
 Galumna arabica Bayoumi & Al-Khalifa, 1984    
 Galumna araujoi Pérez-Íñigo & Baggio, 1994    
 Galumna armatifera Mahunka, 1996    
 Galumna arrugata Jeleva, Scull & Cruz, 1984    
 Galumna atomaria (Berlese, 1914)    
 Galumna australis (Berlese, 1914)    
 Galumna azoreana Pérez-Íñigo, 1992    
 Galumna baloghi Wallwork, 1965    
 Galumna banksi Jacot, 1929    
 Galumna barnardi (Jacot, 1940)    
 Galumna basilewskyi Balogh, 1962    
 Galumna berlesei Oudemans, 1919    
 Galumna betzaida Mahunka, 1992    
 Galumna bimorpha Mahunka, 1987    
 Galumna bradleyi (Jacot, 1935)    
 Galumna brasiliensis Sellnick, 1923    
 Galumna californica (Hall, 1911)    
 Galumna calva Starý, 1997    
 Galumna capensis Engelbrecht, 1969    
 Galumna castanea (Canestrini, 1898)    
 Galumna changchunensis Wen, 1987    
 Galumna chujoi Aoki, 1966    
 Galumna circularis Hammer, 1958    
 Galumna cirripilis (Canestrini, 1898)    
 Galumna coloradensis (Jacot, 1929)    
 Galumna colossus Oudemans, 1915    
 Galumna comparabilis Engelbrecht, 1972    
 Galumna coreana Choi, 1986    
 Galumna coronata Mahunka, 1992    
 Galumna costata Mahunka, 1978    
 Galumna crenata Deb & Raychaudhuri, 1975    
 Galumna cubana Jeleva, Scull & Cruz, 1984    
 Galumna cuneata Aoki, 1961    
 Galumna delectum Pérez-Íñigo & Baggio, 1996    
 Galumna difficilis (Berlese, 1916)    
 Galumna dimidiata Engelbrecht, 1969    
 Galumna dimorpha Krivolutskaja, 1952    
 Galumna discifera Balogh, 1960    
 Galumna dispar Willmann, 1931    
 Galumna divergens Mahunka, 1995    
 Galumna dorsalis (Koch, 1835)    
 Galumna dubia Mihelcic, 1953    
 Galumna egregia Sellnick, 1923    
 Galumna elegantula (Jacot, 1935)    
 Galumna elimata (Koch, 1841)    
 Galumna engelbrechti Mahunka, 1997    
 Galumna euaensis Hammer, 1973    
 Galumna europaea (Berlese, 1914)    
 Galumna exigua Sellnick, 1925    
 Galumna fijiensis Hammer, 1973    
 Galumna flabellifera Hammer, 1958    
 Galumna flagellata Willmann, 1925    
 Galumna floridae (Jacot, 1929)    
 Galumna fordi (Jacot, 1934)    
 Galumna fuscata Kishida, 1921    
 Galumna gharbiensis Bayoumi, Al-Assiuty, Abdel-Hamid & El-Shereef, 1983    
 Galumna gibbula Grandjean, 1956    
 Galumna glabra Pérez-Íñigo & Baggio, 1991    
 Galumna globuloides (Tafner, 1905)    
 Galumna granalata Aoki, 1984    
 Galumna grandjeani Balogh, 1962    
 Galumna hammerae P. Balogh, 1985    
 Galumna heros (Canestrini, 1897)    
 Galumna hexagona Balogh, 1960    
 Galumna homodactyla Karpelles, 1893)    
 Galumna hudsoni Hammer, 1952    
 Galumna humida (Hall, 1911)    
 Galumna imperfecta Hammer, 1972    
 Galumna incerta Pérez-Íñigo & Baggio, 1991    
 Galumna incisa Mahunka, 1982    
 Galumna innexa Pérez-Íñigo & Baggio, 1986    
 Galumna iranensis Mahunka, 2001    
 Galumna irazu P. Balogh, 1997    
 Galumna iterata Subías, 2004    
 Galumna ithacensis (Jacot, 1929)    
 Galumna jacoti Wharton, 1938    
 Galumna karajica Mahunka, 2001    
 Galumna kazakhstani Krivolutskaja, 1952    
 Galumna khoii Mahunka, 1989    
 Galumna lanceata (Oudemans, 1900)    
 Galumna laselvae P. Balogh, 1997    
 Galumna lejeunei Starý, 2005    
 Galumna levisensilla Ermilov & Anichkin, 2010
 Galumna longiclava Pérez-Íñigo & Baggio, 1991    
 Galumna longiporosa Fujikawa, 1972    
 Galumna louisianae (Jacot, 1929)    
 Galumna lunaris Jeleva, Scull & Cruz, 1984    
 Galumna lyrica (Jacot, 1935)    
 Galumna macroptera (Ewing, 1909)    
 Galumna major (Pearce, 1906)    
 Galumna mariae Balogh, 1961    
 Galumna mauritii Mahunka, 1978    
 Galumna maxima (Berlese, 1916)    
 Galumna media (Berlese, 1914)    
 Galumna microfissum Hammer, 1968    
 Galumna minuta (Ewing, 1909)    
 Galumna mollis Kunst, 1958    
 Galumna monteithi Balogh & Mahunka, 1978    
 Galumna monticola Hammer, 1977    
 Galumna mystax C. & C. jr., Pérez-Íñigo, 1993    
 Galumna nigra (Ewing, 1909)    
 Galumna nilgiria (Ewing, 1910)    
 Galumna niliaca Al-Assiuty, Abdel-Hamid, Seif & El-Deeb, 1985    
 Galumna nodula Nevin, 1974    
 Galumna nonoensis P. Balogh, 1988    
 Galumna nuda Engelbrecht, 1972    
 Galumna obvia (Berlese, 1914)    
 Galumna ovata (Berlese, 1916)    
 Galumna pallida Hammer, 1958    
 Galumna parascaber Deb & Raychaudhuri, 1975    
 Galumna parva Woodring, 1965    
 Galumna parviporosa J. & P. Balogh, 1983    
 Galumna perezi Pérez-Íñigo & Baggio, 1994    
 Galumna planiclava Hammer, 1973    
 Galumna polyporus Mihelcic, 1952    
 Galumna pseudokhoii Ermilov & Anichkin, 2011
 Galumna pusilla Sellnick, 1923    
 Galumna reiterata Subías, 2004    
 Galumna reticulata Hammer, 1958    
 Galumna rossica Sellnick, 1926    
 Galumna rostrata Sellnick, 1922    
 Galumna rugosa Hammer, 1968    
 Galumna sabahna Mahunka, 1995    
 Galumna saboori Mahunka, 2001    
 Galumna samoaensis Jacot, 1924    
 Galumna scaber Hammer, 1968    
 Galumna sequoiae (Jacot, 1929)    
 Galumna setigera Mihelcic, 1956    
 Galumna similis Pérez-Íñigo & Baggio, 1980    
 Galumna sinuofrons Jacot, 1922    
 Galumna strinovichi J. & P. Balogh, 1983    
 Galumna swezeyi (Jacot, 1928)    
 Galumna szentivanyorum J. & P. Balogh, 1983    
 Galumna tarsipennata Oudemans, 1914    
 Galumna tessellata (Ewing, 1910)    
 Galumna texana Banks, 1906    
 Galumna tokyoensis Aoki, 1966    
 Galumna tricuspidata Engelbrecht, 1969    
 Galumna triops Balogh, 1960    
 Galumna triquetra Aoki, 1965    
 Galumna tuberculata Mahunka, 1997    
 Galumna unica Sellnick, 1923    
 Galumna valida Aoki, 1994    
 Galumna varia Mahunka, 1995    
 Galumna virginiensis Jacot, 1929    
 Galumna weni Aoki & Hu, 1993    
 Galumna zachvatkini Grishina, 1982

Species under subgenera 

 Galumna (Angulogalumna) Grishina, 1981
 Galumna asiatica (Girshina, 1981)
 Galumna (Cosmogalumna) Aoki, 1988
 Galumna hiroyoshii (Nakamura & Fujikawa, 2004)
 Galumna ornata (Aoki, 1988)
 Galumna praeoccupata Subías, 2004  
 Galumna singularis (Mahunka, 1995)
 Galumna (Erogalumna) Grandjean, 1964
 Galumna zeucta (Grandjean, 1964)  
 Galumna (Indogalumna) Balakrishnan, 1985    
 Galumna microsulcata (Balakrishnan, 1985)    
 Galumna monticola (Balakrishnan, 1985)    
 Galumna neonominata Subías, 2004    
 Galumna pterolineata Hammer, 1972    
 Galumna rasilis Pérez-Íñigo, 1987    
 Galumna undulata (Balakrishnan, 1985)  
 Galumna (Kabylogalumna) Bernini, 1984  
 Galumna rhinoceros (Bernini, 1984)

References

Further reading
Ermilov, Sergey, and Alexander E. Anichkin. "Oribatid mites (Acari: Oribatida) of fungi from Dong Nai Biosphere Reserve, Southern Vietnam."Persian Journal of Acarology 2.2 (2013).
Ermilov, S. G., W. Niedbała, and A. E. Anichkin. "Oribatid mites of Dong Nai Biosphere Reserve (= Cat Tien National Park) of Southern Vietnam, with description of a new species of Pergalumna (Acari, Oribatida, Galumnidae)."Acarina 20.1 (2012): 20-28.

Sarcoptiformes
Animals described in 1826